Aníbal Pinto Santa Cruz (1919 – 3 January 1996) was a Chilean economist known for his work on dependency theory and structuralist economics. From 1960 to 1965 he was director of the United Nations Economic Commission for Latin America and the Caribbean office in Río de Janeiro.

In 1995 he received Chile's National Prize for Humanities and Social Sciences.

He was married to ballerina Malucha Solari and the couple had three children, including the actress Malucha Pinto.

References

1919 births
1996 deaths
People from Santiago
20th-century Chilean economists
University of Chile alumni
Academic staff of the University of Chile
Alumni of the London School of Economics